Rhianne Gabrielle H Barreto (born 25 March 1998) is an English actress. Her work includes the film Share (2019), the ITV drama Honour (2020), and the BBC One series The Outlaws (2021–).

Early life
Barreto is one of nine siblings born in Kensington and Chelsea. Her mother Tracey Barreto is English and her father Ramsey Barreto was born in Iraq and is of Indian and Portuguese heritage. She attended Bishop Ramsey School, the National Youth Theatre and the BRIT School.

Career
In 2018, Barreto was named as one of the Screen International Stars of Tomorrow. She appeared in the 2019 Amazon Prime Video action drama series Hanna (2019) and won the Breakthrough Performance award at the 2019 Sundance Film Festival for her role in Share. She co-starred alongside Keeley Hawes in the 2020 ITV drama series Honour, in which she played the sister of real-life murder victim Banaz Mahmod. She is one of the seven members of the ensemble cast in the comic crime thriller The Outlaws, which premiered on BBC One and Amazon Prime Video in 2021. A second series was filmed concurrently.

Filmography

Film

Television

Web

Audio

Awards and nominations

References

External links
 
 

Living people
1998 births
21st-century English actresses
Actresses from London
British actresses of Indian descent
English film actresses
English television actresses
English people of Indian descent
English people of Portuguese descent
National Youth Theatre members
People educated at the BRIT School
People from the Royal Borough of Kensington and Chelsea